Junior Super Stars is a 2016 Tamil-language children talent-search reality show on Zee Tamil. It was initially premiered from the year 2016 also available to watch on digital platform ZEE5. Based on the Hindi language show India's Best Dramebaaz. It is a children's acting show, between the ages of 4–14 years as the participants. The show first season was premiered on 7 August 2016.

Seasons overview

Host & Judge

Season 1
The first season aired on every Saturday and Sunday at 19:00 from 7 August to 18 December 2016 and ended with 40 Episodes. This show builds up the acting abilities of kids from ages 5-15 years.  Actor and the director K. Bhagyaraj, Khushbu and Archana Chandhoke are the judges of the show. Kiki Vijay (Keerthi Shanthanu) as the host. 

Ashwanth Ashokkumar, the winner of this season and Lisa, the 3rd Runner-up of this season, they are acted together in the serial Mella Thirandhathu Kadhavu aired on Zee Tamil.

 Title Winners of Junior Super Star 1 : Ashwanth Ashokkumar
 1st Runner-up : Vanessa
 2rd Runner-up : Pavithra
 3rd Runner-up : Lisha

Contestants

 Ashwanth Ashokkumar
 Pavithra Rajasekaran
 Lisha Rajkumar
 Adhitri Guruvayappan
 Gokul
 Kasin
 Prathiksha
 Nirmal
 Kaavya
 Sreedhar
 Litish Pranav
 Krishanth
 Diya Sree
 Akshaya
 Devasaran
 Karthika Sree
 Praveen
 Poojitha
 Thirukurali 
 Versha

Special guest Judges 
 Lakshmy Ramakrishnan
 Robo Shankar
 Sathish
 Santhanam

Season 2

The second season was premiered on 13 May 2017. The show was aried on every Saturday and Sunday at 19:00.  Actor and the director K. Bhagyaraj has officially once again been appointed as the judge with Roja and Archana Chandhoke. Kiki Vijay (Keerthi Shanthanu) as the host. The season winner is Bhavass.

 Title Winners of Junior Super Star 2 : Bhavass 
 1st Runner-up : Nithyasri and Karmugil 
 2rd Runner-up : Niharika

Contestants

 Aasmi
 Adithya
 Ajay
 Akshayaa
 Andrieya
 Anushka
 Bhavass
 Bhuvanika
 Hajeera
 Harishini
 Karmukil Vannan
 Lingwswaran
 Manisha
 Migamed Nafil
 Niharika
 Nithya Sree
 Rithanya
 Roshan Krishna
 Saiharish
 Santhosh
 Varun
 Vishwa

Season 3
The third season was premiered on 10 March 2019. The show was hosted by Kamal Dhandapani and Anjana Rangan while Actor K. Bhagyaraj, Devayani Rajakumaran and Rachitha Mahalakshmi are the judges of the show. This show builds up the acting of the children aged 4-14 years show their acting talent in front of the audience. The children will perform for plays with different genres.

Contestants
 Sanvi
 Vishmaya Veeralakshmi
 Tharun Kumar
 Monisha
 Deepesh
 Sahana
 Riya Manoj

Season 4
The fourth season was aired on every Saturday and Sunday at 18:30 from 26 December 2021 to 10 April 2022 and ended with 28 Episodes. Sneha , Mirchi Senthil and Samyuktha Shanmughanathan as the judges. Kiki Vijay (Keerthi Shanthanu) as the hosts. Poornitha and Amuthavanan as the Mentors. The season winner is Elantamizh. 

 Title Winners of Junior Super Star 4 : Elantamizh
 1st Runner-up : Kavyashri
 2rd Runner-up : Sriram

Contestants

 Prashitha
 Aadhavan
 Tarika
 Saathvik
 Sree Saravanan
 Elantamizh
 Samyuktha
 Edil
 Udhai Priyan
 Dhushvanth
 Thanyashree
 Bablu
 Krishika
 Tharun
 Yaliniyan
 Sriram
 Harish
 Aalam
 Sowmiya
 Kavyashree
 Samiksha
 Aparna
 Anvitha
 Aadharsh

References

External links 
 Junior Super Stars at ZEE5

Zee Tamil original programming
2016 Tamil-language television series debuts
Tamil-language children's television series
Tamil-language television shows
2017 Tamil-language television seasons
2019 Tamil-language television seasons
2022 Tamil-language television seasons
Television shows set in Tamil Nadu